Draga is a small settlement on the left bank of the Voglajna River in the Municipality of Štore in eastern Slovenia. The area is part of the traditional region of Styria. It is now included with the rest of the municipality in the Savinja Statistical Region.

Name
The name Draga is derived from the Slovene common noun draga 'small, narrow valley', referring to the geographical location of the settlement.

References

External links
Draga on Geopedia

Populated places in the Municipality of Štore